Mali Ostros is a village in the municipality of Bar, Montenegro. It is located in the Skadarska Krajina region, by Lake Skadar.

Demographics
According to the 2011 census, its population was 111.

References

Populated places in Bar Municipality
Albanian communities in Montenegro